Archie Henry Crowley (died September 30, 1996) was a bishop in the Episcopal Church, serving as suffragan in the Diocese of Michigan from 1954 to 1972.

References 

1996 deaths
Episcopal bishops of Michigan